In special relativity, hidden momentum or hidden mechanical momentum is the mechanical momentum (mass times velocity) that is unaccounted for by Newtonian mechanics. The concept of "hidden momentum" has been used in answering "paradoxes" in electromagnetism and other problems, including the Shockley–James paradox, the Mansuripur paradox, and the Aharonov–Casher effect.

See also
 Abraham–Minkowski controversy
 Aharonov–Casher effect
 Four-force
 Four-momentum
 Relativistic mass

References

External links
 On the Definition of “Hidden” Momentum - Princeton Physics

Special relativity